¡Viva El Amor! (Spanish for Long Live Love) is the seventh studio album by the rock band the Pretenders, released in 1999. The band's lineup for the album is the same as that credited on 1994's Last of the Independents: Chrissie Hynde (vocals, guitar) Martin Chambers (drums), Andy Hobson (bass) and Adam Seymour (guitar). This time, however, the credited line-up actually plays on most of the album, although Hobson is replaced on bass by session musicians on a few cuts.

The album, featuring a cover photograph of Hynde taken by friend Linda McCartney, saw moderate success in the United States and the United Kingdom. Its two lead singles were "Popstar" and "Human", the latter a Divinyls cover. The Class Mix of "Human" was used as the theme music to the short-lived American TV series Cupid as well as featuring in the soundtrack to Brenda Blethyn movie Saving Grace. The album charted in the UK, US and Sweden.

Track listing
 "Popstar" (Chrissie Hynde, Adam Seymour) – 3:34
 "Human" (Shelly Peiken, Mark McEntee) – 3:55
 "From the Heart Down" (Hynde, Billy Steinberg, Tom Kelly) – 3:31
 "Nails in the Road" (Hynde, Steinberg, Kelly) – 3:25
 "Who's Who" (Hynde) – 4:11
 "Dragway 42" (Hynde) – 5:19
 "Baby's Breath" (Hynde, Steinberg, Kelly) – 3:15
 "One More Time" (Hynde) – 3:15
 "Legalise Me" (Hynde) – 3:51
 "Samurai" (Hynde) – 4:43
 "Rabo de Nube" (Silvio Rodríguez) – 1:26
 "Biker" (Hynde) – 4:40

Personnel

The Pretenders
Chrissie Hynde – vocals, rhythm guitar, harmonica
Adam Seymour – lead guitar, bass
Andy Hobson – bass guitar
Martin Chambers – drums

Additional personnel
Jeff Beck – guitar on "Legalise Me"
David Johansen – vocals on "Popstar"
Andy Duncan – percussion, programming
Stephen Hague – keyboards, accordion
Chuck Norman – keyboards, programming, percussion
Jules Shear – backing vocals
Tom Kelly - bass, guitar, backing vocals
Preston Heyman - percussion
Lindsay Edwards - keyboards
John Metcalfe – string arrangements
The Duke Quartet:
Louisa Fuller – violin
Richard Koster – violin
Ivan McCready – cello
John Metcalfe – viola

Production
Recorded and mixed at:
The Townhouse Studio – London
Sarm West Studio – London, RAK Studio – London
Bearsville Sound Studio – Bearsville NY
Innovation Studios – London

Mastered by Ian Cooper at Metropolis Studio – London

Engineered by Julie Gardner, Richard T. Norris, David Boucher, Doug Wynne

Produced by:
Stephen Hague (Tracks 1, 2, 4, 5, 8, 9, 11)
Stephen Street (Tracks 3, 6, 7, 10, 12)

Track 2 remix and additional production by Tin Tin Out for Empire Management, executive producer Rob Dickins

Mixed by:
Bob Clearmountain (Tracks 4, 6, 8, 9, 10, 11, 12)
Stephen Hague and Richard T. Norris (Tracks 1 and 5)

Cover photo: Linda McCartney
Inner sleeve photos: Mary McCartney
Artwork: Michael Nash Associates

Charts

References 

The Pretenders albums
1999 albums
Albums produced by Stephen Street
Albums produced by Stephen Hague
Warner Records albums